MMT may refer to:

Economics 

 Modern Monetary Theory, a branch of economic theory

Geography 

 4QMMT (or MMT), one of the Dead Sea Scrolls
 Myanmar Standard Time (UTC+6:30)

Mathematics 

 MacMahon Master theorem, a result in enumerative combinatorics and linear algebra

Technology 

 MMT (Eclipse), a software project
 Multimode manual transmission, in a motor vehicle
 MPEG media transport, a digital container standard

Science 

 Methylcyclopentadienyl manganese tricarbonyl, an organomanganese compound
 MMT Observatory, an astronomical observatory in Arizona, USA
 MMt, one million metric tons
 Montmorillonite, a clay

Television 
 Miyagi Television Broadcasting, a Japanese commercial broadcaster